Osmond F. Field (October 3, 1886 – November 13, 1965) was an American basketball, baseball, and track and field coach. He served as the head basketball (1911–14) and baseball coach (1912–1913) at the University of Missouri.  At the University of Nebraska, he served as track and field coach (1910–11) and head basketball coach (1911).

Head coaching record

Basketball

References

External links
 

1886 births
1965 deaths
Basketball coaches from Massachusetts
Missouri Tigers baseball coaches
Missouri Tigers men's basketball coaches
Nebraska Cornhuskers men's basketball coaches
Nebraska Cornhuskers track and field coaches
Sportspeople from Lowell, Massachusetts